The Royal Aircraft Factory F.E.7 was a design project based on the company's F.E.4, except the F.E.7 was intended to be a two-seater, as well as a long-range bomber.

Design and development
The F.E.7 was powered by two Rolls-Royce pusher engines, each generating . These were mounted within the fuselage and drove the propellers by means of gears and shafts. It was armed with a Coventry Ordnance Works one-pounder gun, and a few Lewis machine guns. However, the project was abandoned.

Specifications

References

F.E.7